HDRM may refer to:
Heart of Dixie Railroad Museum, Alabama
High-density reactive materials